Wells was a community in Kings County, New Brunswick, Canada. It was incorporated into the town of Rothesay on January 1, 1998.                                                                                                                                          
The townsite is located 6.51 km east of Rothesay.

A post office was established in 1880 and removed in 1930.

In 1898, Wells was a farming settlement with a population of 40.

References 

Neighbourhoods in New Brunswick
Former municipalities in New Brunswick
Populated places disestablished in 1998